Sónia Patricia Pereira Matias (born 17 May 1983) is a Portuguese former football defender who played for Prainsa Zaragoza and RCD Espanyol of Spain's Primera División. She also played for SU 1º Dezembro in Portugal's Campeonato Nacional. With the Portugal national team she won 55 caps between 2005 and 2012, scoring four goals.

She ended her playing career in summer 2014, after Espanyol decided not to renew her contract. She remained in Catalonia and in October 2014 she took a job as women's football co-ordinator at Molins de Rei CF.

References

External links

 
 Profile at aupaAthletic.com 
 Profile at Portuguese Football Federation 

1983 births
Living people
People from Loures
Portuguese women's footballers
Portuguese expatriate sportspeople in Spain
Portuguese expatriate women's footballers
Portugal women's international footballers
Expatriate women's footballers in Spain
Primera División (women) players
Zaragoza CFF players
RCD Espanyol Femenino players
Footballers from Lisbon
Women's association football defenders
S.U. 1º Dezembro (women) players
Campeonato Nacional de Futebol Feminino players
Sportspeople from Lisbon District